Zoe Naylor (born 4 July 1977) is an Australian actress, journalist and television presenter.

Early life and education
Naylor was born in Sydney, Australia to Richard Naylor, a veterinarian, and Neroli, an English and History teacher. She graduated from Loreto Normanhurst where she was School Captain while training with the Australian Theatre for Young People in Sydney, then attended Charles Sturt University in Bathurst under a Seven Network scholarship. Naylor attended University of Technology in Sydney for a year to complete her Bachelor of Arts in Communications degree.

Career
She was an announcer for Groove FM, then worked in television for A Current Affair, Escape with ET, The Footy Show, Gladiators, MTV Australia, National Nine News and SportsCafe (NZ). She has also written for magazines such as Australian Traveller and Road Rider.

After graduating from the Queensland University of Technology in 2002 with a Masters in Drama, she appeared in regional theatre productions. In 2005, she was cast as Regan McLeod in the television series McLeod's Daughters. She was also cast in the New Zealand series Orange Roughies. She later appeared in films such as The Reef (2010) and Robotropolis (2011).

Personal life

Naylor married James Trude on 12 May 2007. She later divorced and began dating Aaron Jeffery. The couple welcomed their first child together, a daughter called Sophia Jade Jeffery, in 2012 and their second child, a son called Beau Charles Jeffery in 2016.

Selected filmography

Film
 2011: Robotropolis
 2010: The Reef
 2005: Book of Revelation
 2004: On the Lurk
 2003: , Abby
 2002: Sugar and Spice
 2000: A Love Story
 2000: The Product
 1999: Fearless, Hetty

Television
 2016–2017, 2018: Home and Away, Nina Gilbert
 2008: Gladiators, herself
 2006: Orange Roughies, Jane Durant
 2005–2009: McLeod's Daughters, Regan McLeod
 2003: The Cooks, "Nights of Living Dangerously", Janie

Bibliography

Contributor

References

External links
 Official website
 Zoe Naylor at The Global Townhall
 

Australian film actresses
Australian television actresses
Australian game show hosts
Living people
Macquarie University alumni
Actresses from Sydney
Queensland University of Technology alumni
University of Technology Sydney alumni
Australian female models
Models from Sydney
1977 births